Alison Comyn (born 28 October 1969, Drogheda, County Louth) is an Irish television journalist and broadcaster. 
She currently presents Sky World News on Sky News, and occasionally presented Sunrise with Stephen Dixon, She was formerly the news anchor of UTV Ireland's weekday news and current affairs programmes Ireland Live news and Ireland Live news at 10 which aired between January 2015 and January 2017. It won the IFTA for Best News programme for its Brexit coverage in 2016.

Journalism career
Comyn previously worked on programmes with RTÉ, BBC, Sky News and Channel 4. Prior to working at UTV Ireland, she was a reporter with Independent Newspapers, covering regional, political, crime and current affairs issues, including her column "Comyn Sense". She was also a reporter and news anchor with Newsline on BBC NI and Sky News Ireland.

She also presented BBC1's national Holiday programme from 1997-2000, where she worked alongside Jill Dando, Carol Smillie and Craig Doyle.

In April 2017, she presented RTE's Liveline programme on RTÉ Radio 1 for two weeks.

Personal life
Comyn is married to Malachy Murphy and they live in Drogheda with their two children, Holly and Luke.

References

Living people
UTV (TV channel)
People from County Louth
1969 births